Alfredo Nicolás Cotera (born 5 November 1977 in Buenos Aires, Argentina) is an Argentine former professional footballer who played as a defender for clubs of Argentina, Chile, Colombia, Italy and Hungary.

Clubs
 Huracán 1997-1999
 Millonarios 1999–2000
 Monza 2001
 Universidad de Concepción 2002
 Szombathelyi Haladás 2003–2004
 Deportivo Español 2005–2006

External links
 

1977 births
Living people
Argentine footballers
Association football defenders
Universidad de Concepción footballers
Club Atlético Huracán footballers
Millonarios F.C. players
A.C. Monza players
Szombathelyi Haladás footballers
Deportivo Español footballers
Primera B de Chile players
Categoría Primera A players
Chilean Primera División players
Argentine Primera División players
Argentine expatriate footballers
Argentine expatriate sportspeople in Chile
Expatriate footballers in Chile
Argentine expatriate sportspeople in Colombia
Expatriate footballers in Colombia
Argentine expatriate sportspeople in Hungary
Expatriate footballers in Hungary
Argentine expatriate sportspeople in Italy
Expatriate footballers in Italy
Footballers from Buenos Aires